The Medical Component of the Belgian Armed Forces is the military medical service which provides medical support for its members in home and abroad operations, participating in humanitarian aid and providing certain services to the civilian society. The current Commander of the Medical Component is General-major Marc Ongena (since September 2021).

Organization 

The Medical Component is commanded by a Major General and has the following organization:

 Medical Component Operational Command (COMOPSMED), in Evere
 Medical Component Competence Centre, in Neder-Over-Heembeek
 Queen Astrid Military Hospital, in Neder-Over-Heembeek
 14th Medical Battalion, in Peutie and Lombardsijde
 Headquarters and Services Company, 3x medical companies (one company supports the Air Component, one company supports the Maritime Component, and one Paracommando qualified company supports the Special Operations Regiment)
 23rd Medical Battalion, in Leopoldsburg and Marche-en-Famenne 
 Headquarters and Services Company, 3x medical companies (supporting the Land Component including units of the Motorized Brigade)
 5th Medical Supplies and Distribution Element, in Nivelles

Ranks

Officer ranks

Other ranks

Equipment

Weapons
FN Five-seven mk2 
FN P90

Vehicles
Agusta A109 Medevac from Air Component
John Deere M-Gator
Pandur 6X6 Ambulance from Land Component (Driven and Maintained by Motorized Brigade Personnel) 
Renault Premium Cargo
Toyota Land Cruiser
Unimog Ambulance 4X4
Volvo 10T
Volvo Recovery
Volkswagen Ambulance LT35
Refrigerator Plasma Volvo (Thermoking)
Jeep 4X4 Bombardier
Volvo 10T Cargo (6X4)
Ford Transit Ambulance

Princely Members
  Princess Astrid of Belgium is Colonel of the Medical Component.

External links
Official website of the Medical Component (in Dutch) 
Official website of the Medical Component (in French)

References 

 
Military medical organizations